Carlo Jørgensen (25 March 1903 – 20 December 1972) was a Danish wrestler. He competed in the men's freestyle lightweight at the 1928 Summer Olympics.

References

1903 births
1972 deaths
Danish male sport wrestlers
Olympic wrestlers of Denmark
Wrestlers at the 1928 Summer Olympics
Sportspeople from Copenhagen